Billy Kershaw is a professional rugby league footballer who played in the 2000s.

References

External links
Stanley Rangers ARLFC - Roll of Honour

Dewsbury Rams players
Living people
English rugby league players
Place of birth missing (living people)
Rugby league second-rows
Sheffield Eagles players
Year of birth missing (living people)